Juan Carlos (born 7 March 1965) is a Spanish weightlifter. He competed in the men's light heavyweight event at the 1992 Summer Olympics.

References

External links
 

1965 births
Living people
Spanish male weightlifters
Olympic weightlifters of Spain
Weightlifters at the 1992 Summer Olympics
Place of birth missing (living people)
20th-century Spanish people